Tadej Matijašić (born 22 January 1994) is a Slovenian handball player who plays for RD Koper 2013.

References

http://www.eurohandball.com/ec/cl/men/2015-16/player/547172/TadejMatijasic

1994 births
Living people
Slovenian male handball players
Handball players from Ljubljana
21st-century Slovenian people